The Equivalent was a sum negotiated at £398,085 10s. 0d. paid to Scotland by the English Government under the terms of the Acts of Union 1707. Proposals for it first emerged in the course of abortive Union negotiations in 1702 to 1703.

The Equivalent's purposes were ostensibly to take account of the contribution that Scots taxpayers would then make towards servicing the English national debt and as transitional mitigation of the effects of higher taxes on the Scottish economy. Though attempts have been made to see it as a precise calculation, it is now generally regarded as part of a political bargain designed for other purposes as well, such as the costs of winding up the Company of Scotland which had undertaken the Darien scheme. Shareholders in and creditors of the Company were to receive 58.6% of The Equivalent. It was also suggested that payments found their way to members of the Scottish Parliament who voted for its abolition.

The fund was ultimately overseen in 1728 by Patrick Campbell, Lord Monzie, a Scottish Law Lord.

Further information

For further information on the context and background see Acts of Union 1707.

References

Unionism in Scotland
England–Scotland relations
Negotiation
Payments
1707 in Scotland
1707 in England
1707 in international relations